Howard Fleming Hesson (June 18, 1891 – April 1, 1955) was a Canadian professional ice hockey goaltender. He played with the Toronto Shamrocks of the National Hockey Association during the 1914–15 season. Hesson also played with the Canadian Soo team out of Sault Ste. Marie, Ontario in the American Amateur Hockey Association (AAHA).

He is buried at Greenwood Cemetery in Sault Ste. Marie, Ontario.

References

1891 births
1955 deaths
Canadian ice hockey players
Ice hockey people from Ontario
People from Stratford, Ontario
Toronto Shamrocks players